Rinorea dasyadena is a species of plant in the Violaceae family. It is found in Colombia, Costa Rica, and Panama.

References

dasyadena
Least concern plants
Taxonomy articles created by Polbot